Erbium(III) fluoride is the fluoride of erbium, a rare earth metal, with the chemical formula ErF3. It can be used to make infrared light-transmitting materials and up-converting luminescent materials.

Production
Erbium(III) fluoride can be produced by reacting erbium(III) nitrate and ammonium fluoride:
 Er(NO3)3 + 3 NH4F → 3 NH4NO3 + ErF3

References

Further reading
 

Erbium compounds
Fluorides
Lanthanide halides